Melinda Ann Rhoads (née Hale; born April 19, 1955) is an American former handball player who played with the United States women's national handball team at the 1984 Summer Olympics.

Personal life
Rhoads is married to former professional basketball player Robert Rhoads. Their daughter, Jence Ann Rhoads, is a former professional basketball player and a member of the United States national handball team.

References

External links

1955 births
Living people
American female handball players
Olympic handball players of the United States
Handball players at the 1984 Summer Olympics